Monte Conero or Mount Conero, also known as Monte d'Ancona (Mount of Ancona), is a promontory in Italy, situated directly south of the port of Ancona on the Adriatic Sea.

The name Conero comes from the Greek name  (Kómaros) and indicates the strawberry tree which is common on the slopes of the mountain. Mount Conero is 572 metres high and it is the only coastal high point on the Adriatic sea between Trieste and the Gargano massif in the region of Apulia.

Since 1987 it has been a state park and a protected ecological area (Regional Park) with 18 trails and several archeological/historical sites. Wildlife include Eurasian badger, beech marten, least weasel, yellow-bellied toad, peregrine falcon, kingfisher and pallid swift. Apart the strawberry tree, vegetation include oak, holm oak, Aleppo pine, Cupressus sempervirens and many others.

Other comuni near the mountain include Sirolo and Numana.

External links 
 Parco del Conero website 
 - a view of a part of the Milky Way facing the Andromeda constellation at the twin rocks of "Due Sorelle"

Conero